The ELA Aviation ELA 10 Eclipse is a Spanish, two place, enclosed autogyro, designed and built by ELA Aviación of Córdoba, Andalusia, introduced at the AERO Friedrichshafen airshow in 2014. The aircraft is supplied complete and ready-to-fly.

Design and development
The ELA 10 Eclipse has a single main rotor, a two-seats-in tandem enclosed cockpit with a bubble canopy, tricycle landing gear with wheel pants, plus a tail caster and a four-cylinder, liquid and air-cooled, four stroke  Rotax 912 ULS or turbocharged  Rotax 914 engine in pusher configuration.

The aircraft fuselage is made from composites.

Specifications (ELA 10 Eclipse)

See also
List of rotorcraft

References

External links

10
2010s Spanish sport aircraft
Single-engined pusher autogyros